The 2012 NAIA Division I women's basketball tournament was the tournament held by the NAIA to determine the national champion of women's college basketball among its Division I members in the United States and Canada for the 2011–12 basketball season.

Oklahoma City defeated Union (TN) in the championship game, 69–48, to claim the Stars' sixth NAIA national title and first since 2002.

The tournament was played at the Frankfort Convention Center in Frankfort, Kentucky, the first venue change for the event since 1990.

Qualification

The tournament field remained fixed at thirty-two teams, which were sorted into four quadrants of eight teams each. Within each quadrant, teams were seeded sequentially from one to eight based on record and season performance.

The tournament continued to utilize a simple single-elimination format.

Bracket

See also
2012 NAIA Division I men's basketball tournament
2012 NCAA Division I women's basketball tournament
2012 NCAA Division II women's basketball tournament
2012 NCAA Division III women's basketball tournament
2012 NAIA Division II women's basketball tournament

References

NAIA
NAIA Women's Basketball Championships
2012 in sports in Kentucky